ICC World Cricket League Division Two forms part of the World Cricket League (WCL) system. Like all other divisions, WCL Division Two is contested as a standalone tournament rather than as an actual league. Unlike lower divisions, however, matches in Division Two hold list-A status.

The inaugural Division Two tournament was held in 2007, hosted by Namibia and featured six teams, the top four of which progressed to the 2009 World Cup Qualifier. The 2011 tournament, played in Dubai, similarly qualified the top four teams for the 2014 World Cup Qualifier, but also promoted the top two teams to the Intercontinental Cup and the WCL Championship. The 2015 Division Two event, again hosted by Namibia, served only to qualify teams for the Intercontinental Cup and WCL Championship. The top two teams at the 2018 event were promoted to the 2018 World Cup Qualifier.

Following the conclusion of the 2019 tournament, the World Cricket League was replaced by the ICC Cricket World Cup League 2 and the ICC Cricket World Cup Challenge League. The top four teams joined Scotland, Nepal and the United Arab Emirates in the 2019–21 ICC Cricket World Cup League 2 and gained One Day International status. The bottom two teams progressed to the 2019–21 ICC Cricket World Cup Challenge League, along with other teams from the World Cricket League.

Overall, 14 teams participated in the five Division Two tournaments. Namibia was the only team to appear in all Division Two tournaments.

Results

Performance by team
Legend
 – Champions
 – Runners-up
 – Third place
Q – Qualified
    — Hosts

Player statistics

References

Division 2